SP42 is the name for a Polish diesel locomotive used for passenger services.

History
The SP42 is in fact the same locomotive as SM42, but modified for passenger transport. The modification was carried out by adding a heating system for passenger cars on the locomotive. Withdrawal of this class started in '90s, some of them was rebuilt into SU42 class (electrical heating instead of steam). SP42 class were totally withdrawn from PKP's service in year 2008. The last one (number 007 from depot Skarżysko Kamienna) made its special run with Bhp class double deckers from Skarżysko to Tomaszów Mazowiecki.

Nicknames
This loco used to be called the following names:
Łajka
Kociołek (eng. boiler) - because of the steam heating system
Zebra - from the painting
Wibrator (eng. Vibrator) - from vibrations produced by the engine
Eleska - from the factory number: Ls800
Fablok - from the name of the producer

See also
Polish locomotives designation

External links
Chabówka Rail Museum

Diesel-electric locomotives of Poland
Bo′Bo′ locomotives
Standard gauge locomotives of Poland
Railway locomotives introduced in 1967